Amelia Valcárcel (November 16, 1950) is a Spanish philosopher and feminist.  She is considered within the “philosophic feminism” as part of the “equality feminism” approach. In 2015 she is a professor in Moral and Political Philosophy at the National University of Distance Education and since 2006 is member of the Spanish Council of State.

Early life and education
Valcárcel was born in Madrid. She studied Philosophy at the Universities of Oviedo and Valencia, in Spain.

Professional life 
Valcárcel worked at the University of Oviedo for three decades, before becoming Professor in Moral and Political Philosophy at the National University of Distance Education.

She has participated and organized numerous seminars and conferences in the fields of Philosophy, moral values and women’s rights. She has been also taken part in national and international panels and boards, as well as playing an advisory role at editorial and journal boards. She was the director of the magazine Leviatán.

Valcárcel is actively engaged in public affairs in Spain. She has performed various public roles, including State Counsellor and Vice-President of the Real Patronage of the Museo del Prado. Between 1993 and 1995, she was Counsellor for Education, Culture, Sports and Youth in the regional government of Asturias.

Philosophy and feminism 

Valcárcel’s academic life has been mainly devoted to two academic fields: philosophy and feminist studies.

Within the subject area of Feminist Philosophy, Valcárcel is considered to be part of the equality feminism approach. Her most distinctive contribution to the field of feminist thinking has been to place feminism within the canonic history of political philosophy, especially in her monograph Feminismo en el mundo global (2008). She has written several manuscripts, some of them translated into other languages. Her theoretical thinking is close to that of the equally well-known Spanish philosophers Celia Amorós and Victoria Camps.

Valcárcel takes the philosophical position that the nexus between women is not the nature or essence of themselves, opposite to the difference feminism arguments, it is however the patriarchal and hetero-designation, the role which patriarchal assigns to women (mother, daughter, espouse and prostitute…) and especially the role women occupy in society which has been depicted by men. Likewise, the role and common denominator that all women share is their functional status (submission) different from men.

Writings 

 Hegel y la Ética (1989) (Heguel and Ethic)
 Sexo y Filosofía (1991) (Sex and Philosophy)
 Del miedo a la igualdad (1993) (From Fear to Equality). Finalist of the National Essay Book Prize 1994
 La política de las mujeres (1997) (Women’s politics)
 Ética contra estética (1998) (Ethic against Aesthetic)
 Rebeldes (2000) (Rebels)
 Ética para un mundo global (2002) (Ethic for a global world)
 Hablemos de Dios (2007) (Let’s Talk of God) co-authored with Victoria Camps.
 Feminismo en un mundo global (2009) (Feminism in a global world)
 La memoria y el perdón (2010) (Memory and forgiveness)

Editions 

 El Concepto de Igualdad (The Concept of Equality)
 Los Desafíos del Feminismo en el siglo XXI (The Challenges of Feminism in the 21st Century)
 Pensadoras del siglo XX (Thinkers of the 20th Century)
 El sentido de la Libertad (The Meaning of Freedom)
 El Debate del voto femenino en la Constitución de 1931 (The Debate of Women's Suffrage in the Spanish 1931 Constitution)
 Feminismo, género e igualdad (Feminism, Gender and Equality)

References

External links 

 Amelia Valcarcel website
 Older archived Amelia Valcarcel website
 Pienso luego existo -  Amelia Valcarcel Chapter RTVE series in which Amelia Valcarcel talks about her philosophical thought. 
 Una filósofa en combate Interview "El País" November 2006
 International authorities file 

1950 births
Living people
20th-century Spanish  philosophers
20th-century Spanish women writers
20th-century Spanish writers
21st-century Spanish philosophers
21st-century Spanish women writers
Anti-pornography feminists
Continental philosophers
Feminist studies scholars
Feminist philosophers
Gender studies academics
Spanish feminists
Spanish feminist writers
Recipients of the Civil Order of Alfonso X, the Wise
Spanish women philosophers
People from Madrid
Political philosophers
Spanish women critics